Kirya may refer to:

Places
Kirya, HaKirya or The Kirya area in central Tel Aviv
Kirya Tower skyscraper in Tel Aviv
Kirya, Russia, :ru:Киря, village in Alatyrsky District, Chuvash Republic, Russia, hometown of cosmonaut Nikolai Budarin
Kirya language, dialect of Kirya-Konzəl language Chadic language of Nigeria

People
George Kirya (born 1939), Ugandan politician and diplomat
Maurice Kirya (born 1982), Ugandan musician
 Umar Kirya ( born 1991), Ugandan entrepreneur

Other uses 
Kirya (album), a 1992 album by Ofra Haza